Henry Otho (February 6, 1888 – June 6, 1940) was an American actor. He has worked in The Big Stampede (1932), Mary Stevens (1933), Hard to Handle (1933), The Mayor of Hell (1933), Baby Face (1933), Mandalay (1934), Wonder Bar (1934), Stranded (1935), My Bill (1938), The Fighting Devil Dogs (1938), Overland Stage Raiders (1938), Each Dawn I Die (1939).

Selected filmography

References

Bibliography

External links

 
 
 
 

1888 births
1940 deaths
20th-century American male actors
Male actors from New York City
American male film actors
Male Western (genre) film actors